Großbodungen is a village and a former municipality in the Eichsfeld district, in Thuringia, Germany. Since 1 December 2010, it is part of the municipality Am Ohmberg.

References

Former municipalities in Thuringia